In Greek mythology, Amykos, Latinized as Amycus, was the king of the Bebryces, a mythical people in Bithynia.

Family 
Amycus was the son of Poseidon and the Bithynian nymph Melia.

Mythology 
Amycus was a doughty man but being a king he compelled strangers to box as a way of killing them. When the Argonauts passed through Bithynia, Amycus challenged the best man of the crew to a boxing match. Polydeuces undertook to box against him and killed him with a blow on the elbow.

When the Bebryces rush to avenge him, the chiefs snatched up their arms and put them to flight with great slaughter.

Bay/Port 

During ancient time the bay at modern Beykoz was called Amykos.

Notes

References 

 Apollodorus, The Library with an English Translation by Sir James George Frazer, F.B.A., F.R.S. in 2 Volumes, Cambridge, MA, Harvard University Press; London, William Heinemann Ltd. 1921. ISBN 0-674-99135-4. Online version at the Perseus Digital Library. Greek text available from the same website.
Apollonius Rhodius, Argonautica translated by Robert Cooper Seaton (1853-1915), R. C. Loeb Classical Library Volume 001. London, William Heinemann Ltd, 1912. Online version at the Topos Text Project.
 Apollonius Rhodius, Argonautica. George W. Mooney. London. Longmans, Green. 1912. Greek text available at the Perseus Digital Library.
 Gaius Julius Hyginus, Fabulae from The Myths of Hyginus translated and edited by Mary Grant. University of Kansas Publications in Humanistic Studies. Online version at the Topos Text Project.
 The Orphic Argonautica, translated by Jason Colavito. © Copyright 2011. Online version at the Topos Text Project.

Kings in Greek mythology
Children of Poseidon
Demigods in classical mythology
Characters in the Argonautica
Anatolian characters in Greek mythology